was an American civil rights activist. Influenced by her Japanese-American family's experience in an American internment camp, her association with Malcolm X, and her Maoist beliefs, she advocated for many causes, including black separatism, the anti-war movement, reparations for Japanese-American internees, and the rights of political prisoners.

Early life and education

Mary Yuriko Nakahara was born on May 19, 1921, in San Pedro, California, to Japanese immigrants Seiichi Nakahara, a fish merchant entrepreneur, and Tsuyako (Sawaguchi) Nakahara, a college-educated homemaker, and piano teacher. She had a twin brother, Peter, and an older brother, Arthur. Her family was relatively affluent and she grew up in a predominantly white neighborhood. In her youth, she attended a Presbyterian church and taught Sunday school. Kochiyama attended San Pedro High School, where she served as the first female student body officer, wrote for the school newspaper, and played on the tennis team. She graduated from high school in 1939. She attended Compton College, where she studied English, journalism and art. Kochiyama graduated from Compton in 1941.

Her life changed on December 7, 1941, when the Japanese Empire bombed Pearl Harbor. Soon after she returned home from church, FBI agents arrested her father as a potential threat to national security. He was in poor health, having just come out of the hospital. The FBI was suspicious of photographs of Japanese naval ships found in the family home and his friendship with prominent Japanese, including Ambassador Kichisaburō Nomura. Nakahara's six-week detention aggravated his health problems, and by the time he was released on January 20, 1942, he had become too sick to speak. Her father died the day after his release.

Soon after the death of her father, United States President Franklin D. Roosevelt issued Executive Order 9066, which forced out approximately 120,000 people of Japanese ancestry from the Pacific coast and interned them at various camps across the United States. Yuri, her mother, and her brother were "evacuated" to a converted horse stable at the Santa Anita Assembly Center for several months and then moved again to the War Relocation Authority internment camp at Jerome, Arkansas, where they lived for the next two years. While interned, she met her future husband, Bill Kochiyama, a Nisei soldier fighting for the United States. The couple married in 1946. They moved to New York in 1948, had six children, and lived in public housing for the next twelve years. In 1960, Kochiyama and her husband moved their family to Harlem and joined the Harlem Parents Committee and the Congress of Racial Equality (CORE).

Activist life

Kochiyama met the African-American activist Malcolm X, at the time a prominent member of the Nation of Islam, in October 1963 during a protest against the arrest of about 600 minority construction workers in Brooklyn, who had been protesting for jobs. Kochiyama joined his pan-Africanist Organization of Afro-American Unity. She was present at his assassination on February 21, 1965, at the Audubon Ballroom in Washington Heights, New York City, and held him in her arms as he lay dying—a famous photo appeared in Life capturing that moment. Kochiyama also had close relationships with many other revolutionary nationalist leaders including Robert F. Williams who gave Kochiyama her first copy of Chairman Mao's Little Red Book.
Kochiyama became a mentor to the radical end of the Asian American movement that grew during and after the Vietnam War protests. As organizers of East Coast Japanese Americans for Redress and Reparations, Yuri and Bill advocated for reparations and a government apology for the incarceration of Japanese Americans during World War II, and spearheaded the campaign to bring the Commission on Wartime Relocation and Internment of Civilians to New York. Additionally, Kochiyama founded the Day of Remembrance Committee in New York City to commemorate the day President Franklin D. Roosevelt authorized Executive Order 9066, which caused the forced removal and incarceration of Japanese Americans during World War II. President Ronald Reagan signed the Civil Liberties Act in 1988 which, among other things, awarded $20,000 to each Japanese American internment survivor. Kochiyama used this victory to advocate for reparations for African Americans. In later years, Kochiyama was active in opposing profiling of and bigotry against Muslims, Middle Easterners, and South Asians in the United States, a phenomenon she viewed as similar to the experience of Japanese Americans during World War II.

In 1971, Kochiyama secretly converted to Sunni Islam, and began traveling to the Sankore mosque in Greenhaven Prison, Stormville, New York, to study and worship with Imam Rasul Suleiman.

Kochiyama also taught English to immigrant students and volunteered at soup kitchens and homeless shelters in New York City. In Debbie Allen's television series Cool Women (2001), Kochiyama stated, "The legacy I would like to leave is that people try to build bridges and not walls."

Advocacy

Kochiyama has been described as a woman of "complicated political beliefs" and at times "contradictory views" who managed to combine support for both racial integration and separation. She admired Mao Zedong and Ho Chi Minh.

Kochiyama supported the Peruvian Maoist guerrilla group Shining Path. She joined a delegation to Peru, organized by the American Maoist Revolutionary Communist Party, to gather support for Abimael Guzmán, the imprisoned leader of the Shining Path. Kochiyama stated "[t]he more I read, the more I came to completely support the revolution in Peru."

Kochiyama in the mid-1960s joined the Revolutionary Action Movement, a black nationalist organization dedicated to urban guerrilla warfare which was one of the first organizations in the black liberation movement to attempt to construct an ideology based on a synthesis of the thought of Malcolm X, Marx, Lenin, and Mao Zedong. In 1968 she was one of the few non-blacks invited to join the Republic of New Africa which advocated the establishment of a separate black nation in the Southern United States. Kochiyama joined, and subsequently sided with, an RNA faction which felt that the need to build a separate black nation was even more important than the struggle for civil rights in Northern cities. After Kochiyama became a "citizen" of the RNA she decided to drop her "slave name" Mary and used only the name Yuri.

Kochiyama founded and sustained the David Wong Support Committee, which after a fourteen-year battle succeeded in exonerating Wong of the murder of a fellow inmate. Kochiyama wrote letters to, fundraised for, and visited Wong in prison.

Kochiyama supported people she saw as political prisoners and victims of FBI oppression. She worked on behalf of Mumia Abu-Jamal, an African-American activist sentenced to death in 1982 for the 1981 murder of Philadelphia police officer Daniel Faulkner. She was a friend and supporter of Assata Shakur, an African-American activist and member of the former Black Liberation Army (BLA), who had been convicted of the first-degree murder of a New Jersey State Trooper before escaping from U.S. prison and receiving asylum in Cuba. She stated that to her Shakur was like "the female Malcolm [X] or the female Mumia [Abu-Jamal]." She also supported Marilyn Buck, a feminist poet, who was imprisoned for her participation in Shakur's 1979 prison escape, the 1981 Brink's robbery and the 1983 U.S. Senate bombing. Yuri was also in correspondence with Mtayari Shabaka Sundiata, her first teacher in the Republic of New Africa's (RNA) Nation Building class,  for six years while he was imprisoned.

In 1977, Kochiyama joined a group of Puerto Ricans who took over the Statue of Liberty to draw attention to the movement for Puerto Rican independence. Kochiyama and other activists demanded the release of four Puerto Rican nationalists convicted of attempted murder—Lolita Lebrón, Rafael Cancel Miranda, Andres Figueroa Cordero, and Irving Flores Rodríguez—who in 1954 had opened fire in the House of Representatives, injuring five congressmen. The nationalists occupied the statue for nine hours before giving up peacefully when the police moved in. President Carter pardoned the attempted assassins in 1979.

In response to the United States' actions following the 2001 September 11 attacks, Kochiyama stated that "the goal of the war [on terror] is more than just getting oil and fuel. The United States is intent on taking over the world" and "it's important we all understand that the main terrorist and the main enemy of the world's people is the U.S. government."

Controversies
Interviewed in 2003, she said, "I consider Osama bin Laden as one of the people that I admire. To me, he is in the category of Malcolm X, Che Guevara, Patrice Lumumba, Fidel Castro ... I thank Islam for bin Laden. America's greed, aggressiveness, and self-righteous arrogance must be stopped. War and weaponry must be abolished."
 
Kochiyama also supported Yū Kikumura, an alleged member of the Japanese Red Army, who was arrested in Schiphol Airport in Amsterdam in 1986 when he was found carrying a bomb in his luggage and subsequently convicted of planning to bomb a US Navy recruitment office in the Veteran's Administration building. Kochiyama felt Kikumura's 30-year sentence was motivated by his political activism.

Honors 

In 2005, Kochiyama was one of 1,000 women collectively nominated for the Nobel Peace Prize through the "1,000 Women for the Nobel Peace Prize 2005" project.

In 2010, she received an honorary doctorate from California State University, East Bay.

On June 6, 2014, the White House honored Kochiyama on its website for dedicating "her life to the pursuit of social justice, not only for the Asian American and Pacific Islander (AAPI) community, but all communities of color."

In 2014, the Smithsonian Asian Pacific American Center curated "Folk Hero: Remembering Yuri Kochiyama Through Grassroots Art", a digital exhibition it characterized as a "tribute".

On May 19, 2016, the U.S. Google Doodle honored Kochiyama's 95th birthday, prompting both praise and criticism of Kochiyama and Google, with Senator Pat Toomey (R-Penn.) calling for a public apology from the company.

March 2019 in conjunction with Women's History Month and International Women's Rights a public art project was commissioned in downtown Grand Rapids, Michigan. It includes Kochiyama from the 2015 children's book, Rad American Women A – Z (by Kate Schatz, Illustrated by Miriam Klein Stahl).

Death

Kochiyama died on June 1, 2014, at the age of 93 in Berkeley, California.

Media appearances

 Kochiyama appeared as herself in the TV movie Death of a Prophet — The Last Days of Malcolm X in 1981.
 Kochiyama appeared in the award-winning documentary, All Power to the People! (1996), by Chinese-Jamaican-American filmmaker Lee Lew-Lee for ZDF-Arte, broadcast in 21 nations and the U.S. between 1996 and 2001.
 Kochiyama was the subject of the documentary film Yuri Kochiyama: Passion for Justice (1993) directed by Japanese-American filmmaker Rea Tajiri and co-produced by African-American filmmaker Pat Saunders.
 Kochiyama and her husband, Bill Kochiyama, were featured in the documentary My America...or Honk if You Love Buddha by the Academy Award-nominated filmmaker Renee Tajima-Peña.
 Kochiyama was the subject, along with Angela Davis, of the documentary film Mountains That Take Wing (2010) by C.A. Griffith & H.L.T. Quan.
 Kochiyama's speeches were published in Discover Your Mission: Selected Speeches & Writings of Yuri Kochiyama (1998), compiled by Russell Muranaka.
 Kochiyama is the subject of a play, Yuri and Malcolm X, by Japanese American playwright, Tim Toyama.
 Kochiyama is the subject of the play Bits of Paradise by Marlan Warren (showcased at The Marsh Theater, San Francisco, 2008), as well as a documentary currently in production, What did you do in the War, Mama?: Kochiyama's Crusaders, a documentary film project that features interviews with Japanese American women internees (Producer: Marlan Warren).
 Kochiyama is mentioned in the Blue Scholars' album Bayani on the title track and has a track titled in her honor in their 2011 album Cinemetropolis.

Notes

References

Further reading

External links

 National Women's History Project article about Kochiyama
 Documentary in production about Yuri Kochiayama's Crusaders

Videos

 
 
 Ladies of Awesome: Yuri Kochiyama
 part 1--Yuri Kochiyama: On Knowing Malcolm X

1921 births
2014 deaths
American twins
Activists from California
American human rights activists
American Maoists
American Muslim activists
American people of Japanese descent
American Sunni Muslims
Asian-American feminists
Converts to Sunni Islam from Protestantism
Japanese-American civil rights activists
Japanese-American internees
Proponents of Islamic feminism
People from San Pedro, Los Angeles
American socialist feminists
Women human rights activists
Transitional justice
American Black separatist activists